Harry Arlanson (May 4, 1909 – March 21, 1998) was an American football and baseball coach. He served as the head football coach at Tufts University from 1954 to 1965, compiling a record of 57–35–2. Arlanson coached football and baseball at Weymouth High School in Weymouth, Massachusetts from 1935 to 1954.  His football teams at Weymouth had a record of 135–19–10.

Playing career
Arlanson played both football and baseball at Tufts, and was captain of both teams, graduating in 1931. As a player, Arlanson's Tufts teams never posted a losing record. While at Tufts, he played summer baseball for Orleans in the Cape Cod Baseball League in 1929 and 1930, catching for an Orleans team that was managed by former Boston Red Sox skipper Patsy Donovan.

Head coaching record

College football

References

External links
 

1909 births
1998 deaths
Tufts Jumbos athletic directors
Tufts Jumbos baseball coaches
Tufts Jumbos baseball players
Tufts Jumbos football coaches
Tufts Jumbos football players
Orleans Firebirds players
Cape Cod Baseball League players (pre-modern era)
High school baseball coaches in the United States
High school football coaches in Massachusetts
People from Lynn, Massachusetts
Players of American football from Massachusetts
Baseball players from Massachusetts